Niniche is a 1918 Italian silent film directed by Camillo De Riso.

Cast
 Camillo De Riso 
 Franco Gennaro 
 Ines Imbimbo 
 Tilde Kassay
 Gustavo Serena

References

Bibliography
 Goble, Alan. The Complete Index to Literary Sources in Film. Walter de Gruyter, 1999.

External links

1918 films
1910s Italian-language films
Films directed by Camillo De Riso
Italian silent feature films
Italian films based on plays
Italian black-and-white films